The 1997–98 season was the 28th season in the history of Paris Saint-Germain F.C. and the club's 24th consecutive season in the top flight of French football. In addition to the domestic league, Paris Saint-Germain participated in this season's editions of the Coupe de France, the Coupe de la Ligue, and the UEFA Champions League.

Players

First-team squad

Pre-season and friendlies

Competitions

Overall record

Division 1

League table

Results summary

Results by round

Matches

Coupe de France

Coupe de la Ligue

UEFA Champions League

References

Paris Saint-Germain F.C. seasons
Paris Saint-Germain